Voděrady is a municipality and village in Rychnov nad Kněžnou District in the Hradec Králové Region of the Czech Republic. It has about 700 inhabitants.

Administrative parts
Villages of Ježkovice, Nová Ves, Uhřínovice, Vojenice and Vyhnanice are administrative parts of Voděrady.

References

Villages in Rychnov nad Kněžnou District